Tamarind juice (also tamarind water) is a liquid extract of the tamarind (Tamarindus indica) tree fruit, produced by squeezing, mixing and sometimes boiling tamarind fruit pulp. Tamarind juice can be consumed as beverage appreciated for its fresh sour taste, or used for culinary purpose as a sour flavouring agent. The recent development uses tamarind juice as a mixture in cocktail.

As beverage 
The juice of tamarind fruit is produced by squeezing and mixing the pulp of tamarind fruit with water. Sometimes the process also include the boiling of tamarind pulp to further extracting the tamarind fruit essence. 

Then the mixed liquid is sieved to separate the juice from tamarind seeds, fibers and bits of fruit shell. The sour-tasting tamarind juice is often sweetened with the addition of liquid palm sugar and often served with ice.

In Indonesia, tamarind juice is called air asem (tamarind water), es asem (tamarind ice) or gula asem (sugared tamarind). It is a popular traditional drink in Java, which is mixed with gula jawa or gula aren (palm sugar). It is also often served as fresh and sour palate cleansing drink after consuming often bitter tasting Javanese jamu herbal drinks.

In Indonesia, tamarind juice is also produced industrially as UHT packed drink marketed as healthy drink sari asem asli or real tamarind juice. There are also commercially mass-produced canned and bottled tamarind juice, offered especially in Asian supermarket.

In Turkish cuisine, tamarind juice is known as demirhindi şerbeti which is tamarind made into sharbat beverage.

Culinary use 

The juice of tamarind fruit pulp is often used as sour flavouring agent akin to vinegar in several Asian culinary traditions; e.g. Indonesian, Thai and Indian cuisine. In Indonesian cuisine, tamarind juice is an essential ingredients as a mixture in peanut sauce for gado-gado and pecel salad. It is also essential flavouring agent in asam pedas  and pindang fish stew and sayur asem vegetable in tamarind soup.

In the flavour of Thai cuisine, the distinctive sourness does not derive from vinegar or lime juice, but through the use of tamarind juice. It is used as a sour flavouring ingredient in pad thai rice noodle, tom khlong spicy sour soup and kaeng som kung sour fish curry.

In Indian cuisine, tamarind juice is often made into pulp, mixed with jaggery and used as flavouring agent for side dishes or condiment.

See also
 Tamarindo

References

External links 

Fruit juice
Fruit drinks